Octavian "Tavi" Abrudan (born 16 March 1984) is a Romanian former footballer who played as a centre back for teams such as: Universitatea Cluj, Gloria Bistrița, FC Brașov or Rapid București, among others.

Personal life
Octavian is the son of former international assistant referee, international match observer and currently Regional manager of Banca Transilvania, Patrițiu Abrudan.

Honours
Universitatea Cluj
Liga III: 2000–01, 2017–18
Liga IV – Cluj County: 2016–17

Gloria Bistrița
UEFA Intertoto Cup: Runner-up 2007

FC Brașov
Liga II: 2007–08

Steaua București
Cupa României: 2010–11

Milsami Orhei
Moldovan National Division: 2014–15

Gaz Metan Mediaș
Liga II: 2015–16

References

External links
 
 
 

1984 births
Living people
Sportspeople from Cluj-Napoca
Romanian footballers
Association football defenders
Liga I players
Liga II players
FC Universitatea Cluj players
ACF Gloria Bistrița players
FC Brașov (1936) players
FC Steaua București players
FC Rapid București players
CS Gaz Metan Mediaș players
Moldovan Super Liga players
FC Milsami Orhei players
Romanian expatriate footballers
Romanian expatriate sportspeople in Moldova
Expatriate footballers in Moldova